The Carrollton Road-Carrollton Segment is a historic 19th-century road in Boone County, Arkansas. It extends for more than  eastward from Carrollton, which was once the county seat of Carroll County. The roadways matching the documented 1837 alignment of the road are (from west to east, beginning at U.S. Route 412) County Road 417, Terrapin Creek Road, and Dunkard Road, up to its junction with Green Hill Road. This stretch of dirt road has retained a 19th-century rural character, and is further significant as a route taken by Native American parties on the Trail of Tears in 1838.

The road was listed on the National Register of Historic Places in 2008.

See also
National Register of Historic Places listings in Boone County, Arkansas

References

Roads on the National Register of Historic Places in Arkansas
Transportation in Boone County, Arkansas
Trail of Tears
National Register of Historic Places in Boone County, Arkansas
1838 in Arkansas
Native American history of Arkansas